Hatfield-Pilgrim Airport was an airfield operational in the mid-20th century in Hatfield, Massachusetts. Its FAA identifier was MA03.

References

Defunct airports in Massachusetts
Transportation buildings and structures in Hampshire County, Massachusetts
Hatfield, Massachusetts